Uxbridge railway station in Uxbridge, Ontario, now serves as a railway museum and a station of the York–Durham Heritage Railway. The station building, constructed by the Grand Trunk Railway in 1904, is owned and maintained by the Township of Uxbridge and has been designated under Part IV of the Ontario Heritage Act.

History

The Toronto and Nipissing Railway originally built a  narrow gauge line in the late 1860s, with service between Toronto and Uxbridge commencing in 1871. In late 1880 the line was converted to standard gauge and soon after this, due to financial reasons, was sold to the Midland Railway in 1881. The line was then firstly leased to the Grand Trunk Railway in 1884; eventually purchased by them in 1894; and finally transferred to Canadian National Railways in 1923.

Grand Trunk constructed the current station building in 1904, with its distinctive "witch's hat" roof, to replace the more basic shed structure that had previously been used.

The Township of Uxbridge bought the railway station from CN in 1988 for $1.00.

Due to the poor state of repair of the roof and the cost of renewal, closure of the heritage train station was discussed by the Township of Uxbridge Council in 2013. It was noted that the structure is important to the community and it is the only train station in Ontario with a witch's hat style roof that is being maintained in relatively good shape.

The remaining sections of track continues briefly and rest removed  with former line becoming part of Trans Canada Trail.

GO Transit

North of Uxbridge to Lindsay the line was abandoned in the early 1990s and the York–Durham Heritage Railway reopened the line to the south between Uxbridge and Stouffville in 1996. That southerly section of trackbed was purchased by GO Transit to prevent abandonment and disposal, because Metrolinx has long term plans to expand service on the Stouffville line to Uxbridge.

Current GO Transit service consists of a connecting bus from the end of the line at Old Elm and from Union Station Bus Terminal at off peak times when there is no train service.

References

External links

Ontario Railway Stations, Uxbridge

Canadian National Railway stations in Ontario
Grand Trunk Railway stations in Ontario
Railway stations in the Regional Municipality of Durham